Mohammad Razigul (born 1942) is a former Afghanistan wrestler, who competed at the 1988 Summer Olympic Games in the light-flyweight event.

References

Wrestlers at the 1988 Summer Olympics
Afghan male sport wrestlers
Olympic wrestlers of Afghanistan
1942 births
Living people
Place of birth missing (living people)
Date of birth missing (living people)
20th-century Afghan people